Kain may refer to:

Kain (given name)
Kain (surname)
Kain Department, a department in the Yatenga Province of Burkina Faso
Mount Kain, a mountain in the Fraser River Valley of Mount Robson Provincial Park, Canada
Kaïn, a folk rock group from Quebec
Kain (Legacy of Kain), the protagonist of the Legacy of Kain series of videogames
Kain (Tenchi Muyo!), a character from Tenchi Muyo! in Love
Kain, an archetype in Fire Emblem
Kain, a former municipality part of Tournai, Belgium
KAIN-LP, a defunct low-power television station (channel 55) formerly licensed to Natchitoches, Louisiana, United States
A former name for Qaen, Iran
Kain panjang, a traditional cloth from Indonesia, often patterned with batik or ikat'
Kain the Dragoon from Final Fantasy IV.

See also
Kain bairns
Kain XVIII, a 1963 film
Rosati-Kain High School, an all-girls Catholic high school in St. Louis, Missouri
Cain (disambiguation)
Cane (disambiguation)
Kane (disambiguation)